Local elections were held in the city of Valenzuela on May 14, 2007, within the Philippine general election. The voters voted for the elective local posts in the city: the mayor, vice mayor, two Congressmen, and the councilors—six in each of the city's two legislative districts.

Election results
The winners of the congressional, mayoral and vice mayoral seats of Valenzuela City are determined with the highest number of votes received. These positions are voted for separately, so there is a possibility that the winning officials come from different political parties.

Mayoral election
Incumbent Sherwin T. Gatchalian ran for re-election. His primary opponent was former mayor Jose Emmanuel "Bobbit" L. Carlos.

Congressional elections

First district
Incumbent representative Bobbit Carlos ran for mayor, first district candidates include incumbent mayor Sherwin's brother, Rexlon, and barangay councilor Eddie Lozada.

Second district
Magtanggol Gunigundo is the incumbent. His opponent was Wes Gatchalian, brother of incumbent mayor Win and Rex.

City council elections 

The voters in the city are set to elect six councilors on the district where they are living, hence registered. Candidates are voted separately so there are chances where winning candidates will have unequal number of votes and may come from different political parties.

First district council

 
 
 
 
 
 
|-bgcolor=black
|colspan=5|

Second district council

 
 
 
 
 
 
|-bgcolor=black
|colspan=5|
 

2007 elections in Metro Manila